The 1946 United States Senate election in Pennsylvania was held on November 5, 1946. Incumbent Democratic U.S. Senator Joseph F. Guffey sought re-election to another term, but was defeated by Republican nominee Edward Martin. This was the last time that the Republican candidate won Philadelphia in an election for the Class 1 Senate seat.

Major candidates

Democratic
Joseph F. Guffey, incumbent U.S. Senator

Republican
Edward Martin, Governor of Pennsylvania

Results

|-
|-bgcolor="#EEEEEE"
| colspan="3" align="right" | Totals
| align="right" | 3,127,860
| align="right" | 100.00%
| align="right" | 
|}

References

Pennsylvania
1946
1946 Pennsylvania elections